DHBP may refer to:
 Dihydrobenzophenanthridine oxidase
 Dehydrobenzperidol, also called Droperidol